The Jeongju Ryu clan is one of the Korean clans. Their Bon-gwan is in Kaepung, Kaesong. It was founded by Ryu Cheon-gung (류천궁) who was a nobleman from Jeongju and served as one of the Three Major Grand Masters (태위 삼중대광, 太尉 三重大匡).

The Legend
Wang Geon firstly meets the future Queen Sinhye in Jeongju-si, Gyeonggi-do while he was still served under Gung Ye's monarch. When those general under Wang Geon suggested him to rebels against Gung, Queen Shinhye's clan, Ryu (류씨), actively persuaded Wang and later got into conflict and revolt.

It who made the family prosperous, Ryu So (류소, 柳韶) become a Jeonjungsieosa (전중시어사, 殿中侍御史) in 1011, Eosajapdan (어사잡단, 御史雜端) in 1016, Saheonjungseung (사헌중승, 司憲中丞) in 1019, and Ganuidaebu (간의대부, 諫議大夫) in 1022, also Taejabingaek (태자빈객, 太子賓客).

The Jeongju Ryu clan was named in Gaepung-gun, Hwanghaebuk-do after the fallen of Goguryeo dynasty. It become located at one of the Gaeseong-gun'S sub-hyeon (속현) in 1018 (9th year reign of King Hyeonjong) and under the jurisdiction of Kaesong Administrative Organization (개성유후사, 開城留後司) in the early Joseon dynasty. Later, in 1442 (24th year reign of King Sejong), it was renamed into "Pungdeok" (풍덕, 豊德) while combined with Deoksu-hyeon (덕수현, 德水縣). However, since Kaesong become the Administrative Division, the name was changed again into Gaepung-gun (개풍군, 開豊郡) while combined with Gaeseong-gun (개성군, 開城郡).

Goryeo Queen Consorts

Came from Jeongju Ryu clan
Jeongju Ryu produced the three-queens consorts of Goryeo, they were:
Queen Sinhye, King Taejo's first wife.
Queen Jeongdeok, King Taejo's sixth wife
Queen Myeongui, King Sukjong's only wife.

Adopted Jeongju Ryu clan
Queen Munhye, King Munwon's only wife.
Queen Seonui, King Daejong's only wife.

See also
Korean clan names of foreign origin
Yoo (Korean surname)

References

Yu clans
Korean clan names of Chinese origin